Christopher Lee "Chris" Catalfo (born December 14, 1959 in Rochester, New York) is an American former wrestler who competed in the 1984 Summer Olympics.

Raised in Montvale, New Jersey he was a state champion prep wrestler at Pascack Hills High School before winning collegiate honors at Syracuse University.

References

1959 births
Living people
Olympic wrestlers of the United States
Pascack Hills High School alumni
People from Montvale, New Jersey
Sportspeople from Bergen County, New Jersey
Syracuse Orangemen wrestlers
Wrestlers at the 1984 Summer Olympics
Wrestlers from New Jersey
American male sport wrestlers
Pan American Games medalists in wrestling
Pan American Games gold medalists for the United States
Wrestlers at the 1987 Pan American Games
20th-century American people
21st-century American people